The Zeppelin-Staaken Riesenflugzeuge  were a series of very large bomber aircraft - Riesenflugzeuge ("giant aircraft"), usually powered by four or more engines, designed and built in Germany from 1915 to 1919.

Design and development
The first Zeppelin-Staaken R-planes were made by Ferdinand von Zeppelin, aided by Robert Bosch GmbH (engineers), the V.G.O. I, (Versuchsbau Gotha-Ost), was built at Gothaer Waggonfabrik due to lack of facilities at the Zeppelin works, hence the V.G.O. Designator. This large aircraft set the seal on what was to come, with a  wingspan. The initial "V.G.O."-series of Zeppelin-Staaken "Giants" were very large aircraft by the standards of 1915, and its four-bay interplane-strut per side wing structure, planform shape (having slightly swept-back leading edges) and general wing structural dimensions would be used, almost unchanged, for the entire series of Zeppelin-Staaken multi-engined giant aircraft through to 1917-18. Other design traits were: nacelle-mounted engines, with the strut-mounted nacelles suspended between the mainplanes on either side of the fuselage — these possessed accommodations for engineers and/or gunners; an engine installed in the nose; tricycle undercarriage with the aircraft able to stand nose down or tail down onto a tail-skid; a box like tail unit with biplane tailplanes and twin fins with rudders (some later variants also had a central fin).

The engine installations differed with each aircraft type but generally followed the layout of a single nose engine, usually driving a two-bladed propeller and with the interwing engine nacelles on either side suspended by struts between the mainplanes each housing two engines in tandem, geared to drive single pusher propellers.

Engine installation variations included:

 Paired engines mounted side by side in the nose, geared to a single propeller (not used for the R.VI design)
 Tractor propellers in the nose of the nacelles, driven by a pair of geared engines in tandem via extension shafts.
 Single engines in the nacelles, driving pusher propellers via extension shafts.
 Paired engines side by side in each engine nacelle, driving a single propeller via extension shafts.
 Tandem paired engines driving individual propellers (one pusher, one tractor) via gearboxes and extension shafts.

Construction of the aircraft was almost entirely of wood or plywood with fabric covering, steel detail fittings and struts. The wings were three bay strutted and wire-braced assemblies supporting the engine nacelles, at around mid gap and the single axle main undercarriage units. Despite the wide variations between all the Staaken R-series variants in their engine configurations, the identical 42.2 meter wingspan figures for nearly all of them indicate that nearly identical wing layouts were likely shared by almost all the Zeppelin-Staaken R-series designs built. The square-section fuselage, with curved decking forward of the wings, supported the tail unit and nose twin wheel single axle nose undercarriage and housed the majority of the crew, defensive armament positions, cockpit, cabin, and bomb load.  The later versions, especially the "production" R.VI version, used pre-printed lozenge camouflage on their fabric covering in the attempt to "conceal" them on their nighttime operations over the U.K.

The engine nacelles consisted of semi-monocoque wooden constructions, with the paired engines amidships, a cockpit for the engineer and defensive gun position for the gunner either forward or behind of the engines depending on whether a pusher or tractor arrangement was used. Aircraft using push-pull nacelles, i.e. individual propellers for each engine, had no provision for defensive armament, just a cockpit for the engineer amidships.

Operational history
Flown principally by Riesenflugzeug-Abteilung (Rfa) 500 and Rfa 501 of the Luftstreitkräfte (Imperial German Air Service) on operations, the Zeppelin-Staaken R-planes flew operations over the eastern and western fronts as well as strategic bombing of targets in England and France.

Types
VGO.I

The pre-cursors to the Zeppelin-Staaken R-planes were constructed at Versuchsbau G.m.b.H. Gotha-Ost (VGO), co-located with Gothaer Waggonfabrik A.G. Initially fitted with three  Maybach Mb.IV engines in their original "HS" version, one in the nose and one in the rear of each of the twin engine nacelles, the V.G.O.I was first flown on 11 April 1915. Once accepted by the Kaiserliche Marine the designation R.M.L.1, (Reichs Marine Landflugzeug 1), was applied to the nose and rear fuselage areas. The VGO.I served on the eastern front before being returned to Staaken where two additional engines were fitted in the nacelles. During flight testing, after the extra engines had been fitted, the V.G.O.I crashed in December 1915, killing two of its crew. One built.

VGO.II
Almost identical to the VGO.I, the VGO.II serialed 'R.9/15' also served with the Luftstreitkräfte, (German Army Military Aviation Service), on the eastern front and later as a trainer. One built.

VGO.III (also designated as R.III)
To overcome the low power experienced with the V.G.O.I and V.G.O.II, VGO fitted an identical airframe with six  Mercedes D.III engines in three pairs, two side by side in the nose geared to a single tractor propeller and two side by side in each nacelle, with each pair geared to a single pusher propeller apiece. After delivery to the Luftstreitkräfte as 'R 10/15', the V.G.O.III was used at the eastern front by Rfa500 (Rfa – Riesenflugzeugabteilung – "giant aircraft unit"). One built.

Zeppelin-Staaken R.IV
Built at Staaken after production moved from VGO, the R.IV although generally similar to the V.G.O.III, retained the paired  Mercedes D.III engines in the nose, but was fitted with paired  Benz Bz.IV engines in each of the twin engine nacelles, each pair driving single four-bladed pusher propellers. The sole R.IV serialled 'R 12/15' carried out operations on both the eastern and western fronts. One built, and the only "nose-engined" Zeppelin-Staaken R-plane to survive to the end of the war.

Zeppelin-Staaken R.V
Adhering to the same layout as the previous Zeppelin-Staaken R-planes, the R.V differed in having the engine nacelles arranged as tractor units with tandem mounted  Maybach Mb.IV powerplants and the engineers and gunners transferred to the rear of the nacelles. A single Mb.IV straight-six engine replaced the paired units of the R.IV in the nose. Additional defensive firepower was fitted in the form of the Schwalbennest (swallows nest), a nacelle on the centre-line of the upper mainplane leading edge housing a gunner with a single machine-gun. Serialled R 13/15 the R.V saw service on the western front. One built.

Zeppelin-Staaken R.VI
The first true production Zeppelin-Staaken R-plane was the R.VI. This giant aircraft was powered either by four  Maybach Mb.IV engines or four  Mercedes D.IVa engines. The fuselage was similar to the previous aircraft but the cockpit was extended forward, enclosed and glazed with a gunner's cockpit in the extreme nose. Other improvements included aluminium alloy structure in the triple-finned biplane tailunit, whose twin horizontal planes were built with both inverse camber and a positive angle of incidence to improve the stabilising downforce. Eighteen R.VIs were built serialled 'R25' to 'R39' and 'R52' to 'R54'. The IdFlieg-designated 'R.30/16' example acted as a supercharged engine test-bed, and saw service in the Luftstreitkräfte with Rfa 500 and Rfa 501 on the western front, stationed in the Ghent area. Air raids on England by R.VIs began on 17 September 1917. Many air raids attributed to Gotha bombers were, in fact, carried out by Zeppelin-Staaken R.VI or R.XIV bombers, with direct hits on the Royal Hospital Chelsea with the first 1,000kg bomb dropped on England, on 16/17 February 1918. St Pancras railway station was attacked the next night. During the campaign from 18 December 1917 to 20 May 1918 the R.VIs of Rfa501 made eleven raids dropping 27,190 kg (28 tons) of bombs. Eighteen built.

Zeppelin-Staaken R.VII
Differing little from the R.IV, the R.VII had a revised arrangement of struts in the tail unit. The sole R.VII built, serialled R 14/15, crashed during its delivery flight to the front line.

Zeppelin-Staaken R.XIV
The R.XIV closely resembled previous Zeppelin-Staaken R-planes differing only in engine installation and details. The five Maybach MbIV engines were arranged as push-pull pairs in the nacelles, with the engineer accommodated between the engines, and a single tractor engine in the nose.
Three R.XIVs were built, serialed R 43/16 to R 45/16. R 43/16 was shot down by Captain Yaille of No. 151 Squadron RAF in July 1918.

Zeppelin-Staaken R.XV
The R.XV also carried on the five engine layout of the R.XIV but introduced a large central fin in the tail unit. Three R.XVs were built, serialed R 46/16 to R 48/16, but there is no evidence that they carried out operational flights.

Zeppelin-Staaken R.XVI (Av)
When the new  Benz VI engine became available, early in 1918, Aviatik (Automobil und Aviatik A.G.) at Leipzig-Heiterblick were tasked with integrating the new more powerful engine into the R.VI airframe due to the commitments of the Zeppelin-Staaken factory and Aviatiks experience in building the R.VI under licence. The new engines were installed in the nose positions of the nacelles driving tractor propellers, with 220 hp (164 KW) Benz BzIV engines in the rear positions driving pusher propellers via extension shafts. Three R.XVI (Av)s were built; R 49 was completed in October 1918 but damaged its landing gear during a test flight, evidence that repairs were carried out is not available. R 50 was completed after the armistice as a civil aircraft but was scrapped under the orders of the Military Inter-Allied Commission of Control. Construction of R 51 was well advanced at the time of the armistice, but was not completed.

Zeppelin-Staaken Type “L” Seaplane
Allocated the serial no. 1432 by the Kaiserliche Marine (German Navy) the aircraft was wrecked during trials. One built.

Zeppelin-Staaken Type 8301 Seaplane
In a further attempt to develop a useful large seaplane for the Kaiserliche Marine, Zeppelin-Staaken used R.VI wings mated to an all new fuselage, which incorporated the large central fin of the R.XV, suspended midway between the mainplanes, all supported by floats similar to the 'Type ”L”'. Three were built, serialled 8301, 8303 and 8304, of which 8301 was also tested with a land undercarriage, the existence of 8302 has not been confirmed.

Operators
 
 Luftstreitkräfte – Imperial German Air Service
 Riesenflugzeugabteilung 500 (Rfa500)
 Riesenflugzeugabteilung 501 (Rfa501)
 Kaiserliche Marine

Specifications (R.VI)

See also

References

Further reading
A. K. Rohrbach, “Das 1000-PS Verkehrsflugzeug der Zeppelin-Werke, Staaken,” Zeitschrift für Flugtechnik und Motorluftschiffahrt, vol. 12, no. 1 (15 January 1921);
E. Offermann, W. G. Noack, and A. R. Weyl, Riesenflugzeuge, in: Handbuch der Flugzeugkunde (Richard Carl Schmidt & Co., 1927).
Haddow, G.W. & Grosz, Peter M. The German Giants, The Story of the R-planes 1914–1919. London. Putnam. (1962, 3rd ed. 1988).
Gray, Peter & Thetford, Owen. German Aircraft of the First World War. London, Putnam. (2nd Ed.) 1970. 
Wagner, Ray and Nowarra, Heinz, German Combat Planes: A Comprehensive Survey and History of the Development of German Military Aircraft from 1914 to 1945, Doubleday, 1971.

External links

 Spanish language page on the original Versuchsbau Gotha-Ost VGO R.I Aircraft of 1915
 Photos of remaining pieces of an R.VI
 R.VI article
 Perspective line drawing of Z-S R.VI design
 Riesenflugzeug-Abteilung 501
 A.E.G. G-IV

Zeppelin-Staaken
1910s German bomber aircraft
Military aircraft of World War I
Pusher aircraft
Aircraft first flown in 1915

cs:Zeppelin-Staaken R.VI
de:Zeppelin (Staaken) R.VI
it:Zeppelin-Staaken R.VI
pl:Staaken R.VI
pt:Zeppelin-Staaken R.VI